Vita Malacologica is a  peer-reviewed scientific journal on the subject of malacology, the study of the Mollusca. It is a print journal published in English by the Netherlands Malacological Society. The journal consists of one themed issue per year.

Name

The name "Vita Malacologica" is Latin, meaning "malacological life".

References

Malacology journals
Publications established in 2002
English-language journals
Academic journals published by learned and professional societies
Annual journals